"Children of the plantation" is a euphemism used to refer to people with ancestry tracing back to the time of slavery in the United States in which the offspring was born to black African female slaves (either still in the state of slavery or freed) in the context of the trans-Atlantic slave trade and European men, usually the slave's owner, one of the owner's relatives, or the plantation overseer. These children were often considered to be the property of the slave owner and were often subjected to the same treatment as other slaves on the plantation. Many of these children were born into slavery and had no legal rights, as they were not recognized as the legitimate children of their fathers. This practice was a form of sexual abuse and exploitation, as the European men who fathered these children often used their power and authority to dominantly force themselves upon the black females (girls and/or women) (often 13 to 16 years old or when they commenced menstruation) who were under their control. The trauma and suffering that these children and their mothers experienced as a result of this practice continue to have a lasting impact on the African American community. 

Plantation owners raping female slaves was a common occurrence. These children were born into slavery, through a legal doctrine known as partus sequitur ventrem. They were classified as mulattoes, a former term for a multiracial person. The one drop rule meant that they could never be part of white society. Some of the fathers treated these children well, sometimes providing educational or career opportunities, or manumitting (freeing) them. Examples are Archibald and Francis Grimké, and Thomas Jefferson's children by Sally Hemings. Others treated their multiracial children as property; Alexander Scott Withers, for instance, sold two of his children to slave traders, where they were sold again. 

Alex Haley's Queen: The Story of an American Family (1993) is a historical novel, later a movie, that brought knowledge of the "children of the plantation" to public attention. Edward Ball's Slaves in the Family (1998), written by a White descendant of slave owners, describes this complex legacy. Toni Morrison wrote that this sexual usage of slaves was known as droit du seigneur, the "right of the lord", a term originating in the feudalism of medieval Europe.

See also 

 Families
Essie Mae Washington-Williams, the mixed-race daughter of segregationist politician Strom Thurmond
 Jefferson–Hemings controversy regarding the sexual relationship between Thomas Jefferson and his slave, Sally Hemings, resulting in six children
 Zephaniah Kingsley, Jr., a Quaker slave trader, married, or claimed to have married, a 13-year-old slave he purchased in Cuba; no documentation of the marriage, if it did take place, has ever been produced, but it was honored by U.S. courts after his death.
 Heritage
 African American genealogy
 Atlantic Creole
 Issue (genealogy)
 History
 Colonial American bastardy laws
 Enslaved women's resistance in the United States and Caribbean
 Female slavery in the United States
 History of sexual slavery in the United States
 Slavery in the colonial history of the United States
 Marriage and procreation
 Legitimacy (family law)
 Marriage of enslaved people (United States)
 Non-paternity event
 Partus sequitur ventrem
 Plaçage, interracial common law marriages in French and Spanish America, including New Orleans
Sexual relations and rape
 Sexual slavery
 Slave breeding in the United States

 Other slavery topics 
 House negro and field slaves in the United States, distinctions within the plantation system
 Discrimination based on skin color or "colorism"
 High yellow

References

Further reading 
 

American children
American phraseology
Euphemisms
Slavery in the United States
African-American genealogy
African-American demographics
Mulatto
Plantations in the United States
Race and society
Sexual abuse